This page summarises the Champions Path matches of 2019–20 UEFA Europa League qualifying phase and play-off round.

Times are CEST (UTC+2), as listed by UEFA (local times, if different, are in parentheses).

Second qualifying round

Summary

|+Champions Path

|}

Matches

Sūduva won 10–0 on aggregate.

4–4 on aggregate; Riga won on away goals.

Sheriff Tiraspol won 2–1 on aggregate.

Ararat-Armenia won 4–1 on aggregate.

Ludogorets Razgrad won 5–1 on aggregate.

Slovan Bratislava won 4–1 on aggregate.

Astana won 4–1 on aggregate.

Linfield won 3–2 on aggregate.

F91 Dudelange won 3–2 on aggregate.

Third qualifying round

Summary

|+Champions Path

|}

Matches

Linfield won 5–3 on aggregate.

Sūduva won 4–2 on aggregate.

Ararat-Armenia won 3–2 on aggregate.

3–3 on aggregate; Riga won on away goals.

Ludogorets Razgrad won 9–0 on aggregate.

BATE Borisov won 2–1 on aggregate.

F91 Dudelange won 4–1 on aggregate.

Astana won 9–1 on aggregate.

AIK won 3–2 on aggregate.

Slovan Bratislava won 4–1 on aggregate.

Play-off round

Summary

|+Champions Path

|}

Matches

Ferencváros won 4–2 on aggregate.

Copenhagen won 3–2 on aggregate.

Celtic won 6–1 on aggregate.

3–3 on aggregate; F91 Dudelange won on penalties. 

2–2 on aggregate; Ludogorets Razgrad won on away goals.

4–4 on aggregate; Qarabağ won on away goals.

3–3 on aggregate; Slovan Bratislava won on away goals.

Astana won 3–2 on aggregate.

Notes

References

External links

1C
UEFA Europa League qualifying rounds